Jacqueline Legere (born 1991) is a Canadian stuntwoman and icecross downhill athlete currently competing in Red Bull Crashed Ice. During the 2016 season, Legere finished atop the Crashed Ice standings, emerging as the women’s world champion. When not competing in ice cross downhill, Legere is employed as a stuntwoman.

Athletic career

Ice hockey
During her teens, Legere competed in Ontario's Provincial Women's Hockey League with the Hamilton Hawks from 2009-11. She also competed in the Lower Lakes Female Hockey League with the Cambridge Roadrunners and won a high school hockey championship in Brant County.

Ice cross downhill

Red Bull Crashed Ice
Legere qualified for the Red Bull Crashed Ice race in Quebec City in 2011, making her debut at the event.  During the 2015-16 Crashed Ice season, Legere earned a podium finish in every race except for one, finishing in fifth place in Quebec City.  Her first win of the season took place on January 8, 2016 in Munich, Germany, beating fellow Canadian Myriam Trepanier, who finished in second.

In the final race of the season, held in St. Paul, Minnesota, she finished first in the race, resulting in a first place overall rank in the world rankings. Fellow Ontario native, Tamara Kajah, a former competitor with the UBC Thunderbirds women’s ice hockey program, finished in third place.

To begin the 2016-17 Crashed Ice season, Legere finished in first place in the opening race, contested in Marseilles, France.

References

External links
IMDB page
Official website

1991 births
Canadian women's ice hockey players
Living people
Ice hockey people from Ontario
Sportspeople from Brantford
Canadian stunt performers